Jaceidin is an O-methylated flavonol. It can be found in Chamomilla recutita, in Centaurea jacea and can be synthesized. Jaceidin has many different characteristics, such as a molar mass of 360.31 g/mol. It also has a melting point of 130-135 °C.

Glycosides 
 Jacein

References 

O-methylated flavonols